Roaring Kill flows into the Schoharie Creek by Tannersville, New York.

References

Rivers of New York (state)
Rivers of Greene County, New York